Thomas Forrester  is a fictional character.

Thomas Forrester may also refer to:

Thomas Forrester (politician) (1790–1841), merchant and political figure in Nova Scotia
Thomas Forrester (cricketer) (1873–1927), English cricketer
Thomas Forrester (theologian) (1635?–1706), Scottish theologian
Tom Forrester (1864–?), footballer
Thomas Forrester (architect) (1838–1907), New Zealand architect
Thomas Forrester, presenter and antiques expert on British television programme Bargain Hunt

See also
Tom Foerster (1928–2000), Democratic politician in Allegheny County, Pennsylvania
Thomas Forester (born 1958), mutual fund manager